Lydia Rosina Bieri (born 1972) is a Swiss-American applied mathematician, geometric analyst, mathematical physicist, cosmologist, and historian of science whose research concerns general relativity, gravity waves, and gravitational memory effects. She is a professor of mathematics and director of the Michigan Center for Applied and Interdisciplinary Mathematics at the University of Michigan.

Education and career
Bieri is originally from Sempach, in Switzerland. She studied mathematics at ETH Zurich, earning a diploma (the equivalent of a master's degree) in 2001. She completed a doctorate (Dr. sc.) at ETH Zurich in 2007, with the support of a Swiss National Funds Fellowship. Her dissertation, An Extension of the Stability Theorem of the Minkowski Space in General Relativity, was supervised by Demetrios Christodoulou, and jointly promoted by Michael Struwe.

After postdoctoral research as a Benjamin Peirce Fellow in mathematics at Harvard University from 2007 to 2010, Bieri became an assistant professor of mathematics at the University of Michigan in 2010. She became associate professor in 2015, director of the Michigan Center for Applied and Interdisciplinary Mathematics in 2019, and full professor in 2021.

Books
With Harry Nussbaumer of ETH Zurich, Bieri is the coauthor of a general-audience book on cosmology and its history, Discovering the Expanding Universe (Cambridge University Press, 2009), She is also the coauthor of a research monograph with Nina Zipser, Extensions of the Stability Theorem of the Minkowski Space in General Relativity (AMS/IP Studies in Advanced Mathematics, American Mathematical Society, 2009).

Recognition
Bieri won a NSF CAREER Award in 2013, and was named a Simons Fellow in Mathematics in 2018. She was named a Fellow of the American Physical Society (APS) in 2021, after a nomination from the APS Division of Gravitational Physics, "for fundamental results on global existence of solutions of the Einstein field equations, and for many contributions to the understanding of gravitational wave memory". She was named to the 2023 class of Fellows of the American Mathematical Society, "for contributions to mathematical general relativity and geometric analysis".

References

External links
Home page

1972 births
Living people
People from Sursee District
21st-century American mathematicians
American women mathematicians
American cosmologists
American women physicists
Swiss mathematicians
Swiss women mathematicians
Swiss cosmologists
Swiss women physicists
Cosmologists
Applied mathematicians
Differential geometers
Mathematical physicists
Historians of science
ETH Zurich alumni
University of Michigan faculty
Fellows of the American Mathematical Society
Fellows of the American Physical Society
21st-century American women